Lasioglossum coriaceum is a species of sweat bee in the family Halictidae. A common name is leathery sweat bee.

References

Further reading

External links

 

coriaceum
Articles created by Qbugbot
Insects described in 1853